The 64th parallel north is a circle of latitude that is 64 degrees north of the Earth's equatorial plane. It crosses the Atlantic Ocean, Europe, Asia and North America.

At this latitude the sun is visible for 21 hours, 1 minute during the summer solstice and 4 hours, 12 minutes during the winter solstice.

Around the world
Starting at the Prime Meridian and heading eastwards, the parallel 64° north passes through:

{| class="wikitable plainrowheaders"
! scope="col" width="125" | Co-ordinates
! scope="col" | Country, territory or ocean
! scope="col" | Notes
|-
| style="background:#b0e0e6;" | 
! scope="row" style="background:#b0e0e6;" | Atlantic Ocean
| style="background:#b0e0e6;" | Norwegian Sea
|-
| 
! scope="row" | 
| Islands and skerries of Froan, Trøndelag
|-
| style="background:#b0e0e6;" | 
! scope="row" style="background:#b0e0e6;" | Atlantic Ocean
| style="background:#b0e0e6;" | Frohavet, Norwegian Sea
|-
| 
! scope="row" | 
| Islands and skerries of, and Linesøya, Trøndelag
|-
| style="background:#b0e0e6;" | 
! scope="row" style="background:#b0e0e6;" | Atlantic Ocean
| style="background:#b0e0e6;" | Linesfjorden and Paulen, Norwegian Sea
|-
| 
! scope="row" | 
| Mainland Trøndelag
|-
| style="background:#b0e0e6;" | 
! scope="row" style="background:#b0e0e6;" | Atlantic Ocean
| style="background:#b0e0e6;" | Beitstadfjorden, Trondheimsfjorden, Norwegian Sea
|-
| 
! scope="row" | 
| Trøndelag
|-
| 
! scope="row" | 
|Passing just north of Umeå
|-
| style="background:#b0e0e6;" | 
! scope="row" style="background:#b0e0e6;" | Atlantic Ocean
| style="background:#b0e0e6;" | Gulf of Bothnia, Baltic Sea
|-
| 
! scope="row" | 
|
|-
| 
! scope="row" | 
|
|-
| style="background:#b0e0e6;" | 
! scope="row" style="background:#b0e0e6;" | Arctic Ocean
| style="background:#b0e0e6;" | Onega Bay, White Sea, Barents Sea
|-
| 
! scope="row" | 
|
|-
| style="background:#b0e0e6;" | 
! scope="row" style="background:#b0e0e6;" | Arctic Ocean
| style="background:#b0e0e6;" | Bering Sea
|-
| 
! scope="row" | 
| Alaska - passing through a runway of Allen Army Airfield
|-
| 
! scope="row" | 
| Yukon - passing 6 km south of Dawson City Northwest Territories Nunavut
|-
| style="background:#b0e0e6;" | 
! scope="row" style="background:#b0e0e6;" | Arctic Ocean
| style="background:#b0e0e6;" | Roes Welcome Sound, Hudson Bay
|-
| 
! scope="row" | 
| Nunavut - Southampton Island
|-
| style="background:#b0e0e6;" | 
! scope="row" style="background:#b0e0e6;" | Arctic Ocean
| style="background:#b0e0e6;" | South Bay, Hudson Bay
|-
| 
! scope="row" | 
| Nunavut - Southampton Island
|-
| style="background:#b0e0e6;" | 
! scope="row" style="background:#b0e0e6;" | Arctic Ocean
| style="background:#b0e0e6;" | Foxe Channel
|-
| 
! scope="row" | 
| Nunavut - Mill Island and neighbouring islands
|-
| style="background:#b0e0e6;" | 
! scope="row" style="background:#b0e0e6;" | Arctic Ocean
| style="background:#b0e0e6;" | Hudson Strait
|-
| 
! scope="row" | 
| Nunavut - Baffin Island
|-
| style="background:#b0e0e6;" | 
! scope="row" style="background:#b0e0e6;" | Arctic Ocean
| style="background:#b0e0e6;" | Davis Strait
|-
| 
! scope="row" | 
| SermersooqPassing just south of Nuuk
|-
| style="background:#b0e0e6;" | 
! scope="row" style="background:#b0e0e6;" | Atlantic Ocean
| style="background:#b0e0e6;" |
|-
| 
! scope="row" | 
| Passing just south of Reykjavík
|-
| style="background:#b0e0e6;" | 
! scope="row" style="background:#b0e0e6;" | Atlantic Ocean
| style="background:#b0e0e6;" |
|-
|}

See also
63rd parallel north
65th parallel north

n64